Sports in Washington may refer to:

 Sports in Washington (state)
 Sports in Washington, D.C.